Toffoli is an Italian surname. Notable people with the surname include:

Dario De Toffoli, Italian board game designer
Dias Toffoli (born 1967), President of the Supreme Federal Court of Brazil
Elisa (Italian singer) (born 1977), full name Elisa Toffoli, Italian singer-songwriter
Gaúcho (footballer) (1964–2016), full name Luís Carlos Toffoli, Brazilian footballer
Patricia Tóffoli (born 1960), Venezuelan beauty pageant titleholder
Tommaso Toffoli (born 1943), Italian-American professor of engineering at Boston University
Toffoli gate, a reversible logic gate invented by Tommaso Toffoli
Tyler Toffoli (born 1992), Canadian ice hockey player

Italian-language surnames